Shade 45 is American rapper Eminem's hip-hop station on Sirius XM Radio channel 45 and Dish Network channel 6045.

History
Eminem established his own channel, Shade 45, that plays uncut hip hop. Eminem also established a new morning show, Sway in the Morning with Sway Calloway, a lively morning show that airs at 8:00 a.m., Monday–Friday.

Eminem promoted the station in a 2004 mock national convention (the "Shady National Convention") at the Roseland Ballroom in New York City, in which Donald Trump endorsed him. On his album Revival (2017), Eminem expressed his regret at having collaborated with Trump, rapping, "wish I would have spit on it before I went to shake his hand at the event".

Core artists
Eminem
Kanye West
Dr. Dre
Drake
50 Cent
Kendrick Lamar
Travis Scott
Action Bronson
Wiz Khalifa
Big Sean
Tech N9ne
Schoolboy Q

See also 
 List of Sirius XM Radio channels

References

Eminem
Radio stations established in 2004
Sirius Satellite Radio channels
XM Satellite Radio channels
Sirius XM Radio channels